Kamran Sadeghi is an Iranian born American electronic musician, producer, mix engineer and composer based in New York City.

Career 
Kamran Sadeghi first emerged in 2005 under the alias Son Of Rose, particularly with the 2007 album Divisions In Parallel. In 2020 Kamran worked with artist Zimoun on the album 42:41.  He premiered his video art piece Loss Less at the Louvre.  Sadeghi's album Loss Less, recorded inside the nuclear cooling tower Satsop, was his debut on the record label LINE, curated by Richard Chartier.  He is credited for performing live, producing and mixing the album Killer Road, featuring Patti Smith in 2016 on Sacred Bones Records.  Sadeghi is also credited for mixing, co-producing and co-composing What We Leave Behind featuring Jean-Luc Godard Archives released on The Vinyl Factory.

References

External links
 

American male musicians
American keyboardists
Record producers from New York (state)
Songwriters from New York (state)
Living people
People from New York (state)
Iranian emigrants to the United States
Year of birth missing (living people)
American male songwriters